Aksel Jacobsen Bogdanoff (1922–1971), from Lille Ekkerøy, is noteworthy for two reasons. He was one of those Norwegians who fought as Soviet-controlled partisans in eastern Finnmark in World War II and, in 1953, he was one of two brothers who encountered and shot the last polar bear seen in Finnmark, at Lille Ekkerøy.

Part of the last generation to live on Lille Ekkerøy
{
  "type": "FeatureCollection",
  "features": [
    {
      "type": "Feature",
      "properties": {},
      "geometry": {
        "type": "Point",
        "coordinates": [
          30.248009,
          70.089033
        ]
      }
    }
  ]
}Aksel Jacobsen Bogdanoff was one of eleven children born to Signe Victoria Bogdanoff (1892–1963), née Dahl, from Tromsø, and Jacob Wilhelm Bogdanoff (1878–1940), whose father came from Russia. The other children included: Alfred; Francis; Olav (1917–2002); Karl (1916-1987); Frits (1915-1981); Ingvar (1920–1995), also known as Ingvald; Daniel (1931-1987); and Agnes (1933-2014). The children, three of whom died at an early age, were the last generation who lived on Lille Ekkerøy. They were evacuated during the war, moved to Krampenes, but returned and lived there until about 1953, when they moved back to Krampenes. As part of their subsistence tactics, they collected driftwood on the beach and picked cloudberries in the fields. Aksel married Anne Lise and, before their divorce, had a son called Arvid Sigfred Bogdanoff.

Partisan service

After training as a radio operator in the Soviet Union, Bogdanoff, in April 1944, parachuted alone onto Kvaløya island and set up a radio bearing on the Torskefjord height between large stones. In connection with the Porsa action, he was captured and tortured by a German search party on 9 June 1944. He revealed nothing but he is supposed to have made some deal which the Germans honoured, resulting in his survival.

Polar bear

In 1953, when Aksel Bogdanoff and Ingvald Bogdanoff were out inspecting their salmon nets in the Lille Ekkeroy area, they encountered a polar bear which is believed to have come on an ice-floe from Svalbard. They shot and killed the bear. This is the last time that a polar bear was seen in Finnmark.

References

1922 births
1971 deaths
Norwegian communists
Norwegian resistance members